Paratelphusa is a genus of moths in the family Gelechiidae.

Species
 Paratelphusa griseoptera Janse, 1958
 Paratelphusa reducta Janse, 1958

References

Gelechiinae